Timothy James Farron (born 27 May 1970) is a British politician who served as Leader of the Liberal Democrats from 2015 to 2017. He has been Member of Parliament (MP) for Westmorland and Lonsdale since 2005 and is currently the Liberal Democrat Spokesperson for Environment, Food and Rural Affairs. Prior to entering politics, he worked in higher education. 

Farron was the President of the Liberal Democrats from January 2011 to December 2014. He was the Liberal Democrats' Shadow Foreign Secretary in 2015 under Nick Clegg's leadership. Additionally, he was the Liberal Democrat Spokesperson for Housing, Communities and Local Government from 2019 to 2022, with responsibility for the Northern Powerhouse from 2019 to 2020. He served as Spokesperson for Work and Pensions under Jo Swinson from 2019 to 2020.

Early life and education 
Farron was born in Preston, Lancashire, and educated at Lostock Hall High School and Runshaw College, Leyland, before going on to Newcastle University, where he gained a BA in Politics in 1992. Farron has described how, in his youth, his bedroom bore pictures of such widely differing politicians as the assassinated United States President John F. Kennedy, former Liberal Party leader Jo Grimond, and then–Prime Minister Margaret Thatcher.

From 1987 to 1992, Farron fronted the Preston-based band Tim Farron and the Voyeurs, also known as Fred The Girl. According to Farron, the band was popular amongst Lancashire's youth after a series of highly successful tours. Farron said the band was offered a record deal with Island Records. However, this claim has been countered by former band members instead describing 'Tim Farron and the Voyeurs' as a "fourth rate New Order."

In 1990, he was elected to the National Union of Students' National Executive. The following year, he was elected president of Newcastle University Students' Union, the first Liberal Democrat to hold the position, having joined the Liberal Party at the age of 16. Before his election to Parliament, Farron worked in higher education at Lancaster University from 1992 to 2002 and St Martin's College, Ambleside, from 2002 to 2005.

Political career

Positions beginning prior to 2005 
Farron contested North West Durham at the 1992 general election, where he finished in third place, behind the sitting Labour Party MP Hilary Armstrong and Conservative Party candidate (and future Prime Minister) Theresa May. He then served on Lancashire County Council from 1993 to 2000 and was also a councillor for Leyland Central ward on South Ribble Borough Council from 1995 to 1999.

Farron was selected to contest the Labour/Conservative marginal constituency of South Ribble at the 1997 general election, and again finished in third place.  Thereafter, he was a Liberal Democrat candidate for the North West region in the 1999 European Parliament elections.

At the 2001 general election, Farron contested the Westmorland and Lonsdale seat and finished second, reducing the majority of the sitting Conservative MP Tim Collins to 3,167.  He then served as a councillor for the Milnthorpe ward on the South Lakeland District Council from 2004 to 2008.

Westmorland and Lonsdale from 2005 win to 2009 

At the 2005 general election, Farron again fought Collins in Westmorland and Lonsdale, and this time won this election by a narrow margin of just 267 votes. He made his maiden speech in Parliament on 25 May 2005. As a new MP, he became a member of the Education and Skills Select committee and was appointed as Youth Affairs Spokesperson for the Liberal Democrats. In 2005 he founded the all-party parliamentary group on hill farming, of which he was still chair .

During Menzies Campbell's period as the Liberal Democrat leader, Farron was Campbell's Parliamentary Private Secretary. In 2007 he was made a Liberal Democrat spokesman for Home Affairs.

Farron resigned from the front bench of the Liberal Democrats on 5 March 2008 in protest at the party's abstention from a parliamentary vote on a proposed Conservative referendum on Britain's accession to the Lisbon Treaty. However he later returned to the party's front bench as spokesperson for Environment, Food and Rural Affairs. He is a member of the Beveridge Group within the Liberal Democrats.

2010–2015 
In the 2010 general election, Farron achieved an 11.1% swing from the Conservatives, winning by a majority of 12,264 in his historically Conservative seat. This result was against the run of the rest of the party, making Westmorland and Lonsdale one of the few Liberal Democrat strongholds.

On 27 May 2010, Farron stood for the position of Deputy Leader of the Liberal Democrats, made vacant by the resignation of Vince Cable. On 9 June, Farron lost the competition to the former party President, Simon Hughes. Hughes won by 20 votes; having had 38 nominations from the parliamentary party, compared to Farron's 18.

On 16 September 2010, Farron stood for the position of President of the Liberal Democrats following Baroness Scott's decision not to seek re-election. He won the election with 53% of the vote, beating fellow candidate Susan Kramer on 47%.

In March 2012, Farron was one of three MPs who signed a letter sent to the Advertising Standards Authority, criticising their recent decision to stop the Christian group "Healing on the Streets of Bath" from making explicit claims that prayer can heal. The letter called for the ASA to provide indisputable scientific evidence that faith healing did not work; Farron subsequently admitted that the letter was not "well-worded" and that he should not have signed it "as it was written".

Farron was one of only eight Liberal Democrats elected nationwide at the 2015 general election. He was considered a favourite to succeed Nick Clegg as Leader of the Liberal Democrats.

Leadership of the Liberal Democrats
In May 2015, Farron confirmed his bid for the Liberal Democrat leadership on BBC Radio 4. On 16 July he won the leadership election with 56.5% of the vote, ahead of Norman Lamb who achieved 43.5%.

Farron's first speech at the Liberal Democrat September 2015 Conference in Bournemouth was praised in the press.

At the 2017 General Election, Farron narrowly retained his seat with an 8.4% swing to the Conservatives and a majority reduced to 1.5%, while the Liberal Democrats as a whole increased their seats from nine to twelve, although with a reduced overall share of the vote. Farron stated he would step down as party leader following the election, stating that he had become "torn between living as a faithful Christian and serving as a political leader". He remained in office until the unopposed election of Vince Cable as party leader.

Political positions 

Among political observers, Farron is widely seen as being of left-leaning political position. In a September 2016 interview, he identified the Liberal Democrats under his leadership as being centre-left.

Policy as Liberal Democrat leader 
In August 2015, Farron identified seven campaigning priorities for the Liberal Democrats. These were rural affairs, the EU referendum, mental health, immigration, civil liberties, the green economy, and housing.

Welfare 
Farron was one of only two Liberal Democrat MPs to vote against the under-occupancy penalty (also known as the bedroom tax) in 2012.

Education 
In December 2010, he voted against increasing the cap on undergraduate university tuition fees from £3,000 to £9,000. Referring to Nick Clegg's earlier pledge not to raise fees—and the previous long-standing Liberal Democrat policy of abolishing them—he said: "Integrity is important. You must not only keep your word but be seen to keep your word. You can say no."

Migration 
He was the first senior British politician to back the EU proposal for a quota to take in refugees during the Mediterranean crisis. He called for the UK to accept up to 60,000 non-EU refugees to help with the influx. He attended the Refugee solidarity march in London in September 2015 and gave the opening speech. In the 2016 Liberal Democrat Spring Conference, Farron accused the government of cowardice and heartlessness over their current refugee policy.

Representation of women and minorities 
Farron has said that 50% of target seats will be represented by women and 10 per cent of target seats will be represented by black, Asian and minority ethnic (BAME) candidates.

Farron's appointment of party spokespeople was applauded for its diversity with 12 women and 10 men given positions. Women also took high ranking roles such as defence and economics spokesperson.

LGBT rights 
In 2007, he voted against the Equality Act (Sexual Orientation) Regulations, which for the first time imposed a general restriction on businesses discriminating against people on the grounds of sexual orientation. In May 2015, regarding a court ruling which found that a Belfast bakery had acted unlawfully in refusing to carry out an order for a cake in support of gay marriage, Farron said that "it's a shame it ended up in court" and "it's important that you stand up for people's rights to have their conscience," but "if you’re providing a service, that’s the key thing – you need to do so without prejudice, without discrimination against those who come through your door."

He voted in favour of allowing marriage between two people of same sex at the second reading of the 2013 Marriage (Same Sex Couples) Bill, but he voted not to timetable the debate on the Bill, which would have made it much more difficult to pass had the House of Commons agreed with his position, over concerns of the impact the "spousal veto" could have on trans people. He was absent for the vote for gay marriage on the third reading of the Bill.

In 2014, he voted in favour of extending the right to same sex marriage to Armed Forces personnel outside the United Kingdom. He held a 90.4% rating on the issue of same sex marriage in September 2015, and 83.9% in February 2023, according to the website Public Whip.

During an interview in 2015 with Cathy Newman for Channel 4 News, following his election as leader, Farron avoided a question from Newman on his personal beliefs regarding gay sex, saying that his "views on personal morality [did not] matter", adding  that to "understand Christianity is to understand that we are all sinners". In the build-up to the 2017 General Election he repeated similar lines in another Channel 4 News television interview, before Nigel Evans asked him in Parliament whether he thought being gay was a sin, to which he replied, "I do not" and said that he was "very proud" to have supported his party's efforts to introduce gay marriage. Later, in a BBC interview, he further stated that he did not believe "gay sex" was a sin. Despite this, Lord Paddick resigned from his post as home affairs spokesperson in June 2017 "over concerns about the leader's views on various issues". In 2018, Farron expressed regret over his previous assertions that he did not consider homosexual sex to be sinful, saying he felt under pressure from his party which led him to "foolishly and wrongly" make a statement "that was not right".

Farron's handling of questions regarding LGBT rights and the sinfulness of homosexuality have been heavily criticised by LGBT+ Liberal Democrats, as has his continued association with anti-gay evangelical groups, which has been seen as a "lack of care" to the LGBT community. Former head of the LGBT+ Liberal Democrats, Chris Cooke, made unsubstantiated complaints to the party about Farron's personal conduct when "drunk", and admitted that he "made up a story to cause trouble" following his suspension over Twitter comments directed at Conservative MP Anna Soubry.

European Union 
Despite describing himself as "a bit of a Eurosceptic", Farron strongly supported Britain's membership of the European Union, but criticised David Cameron's renegotiation as "about appealing to careerist Tory MPs, who were selected by Europhobic party members, to persuade them to vote to remain".

In June 2016, Farron stated following the United Kingdom European Union membership referendum in which 51.89% of the voters voted to leave the EU that if the Liberal Democrats were elected in the next parliamentary election, they would not follow through with triggering Article 50 of the Treaty on European Union and leaving the EU but would instead keep the UK in the European Union.

In 2017, Farron spoke out against the government's proposed plan to return to the traditional blue British passport. He criticised the move publicly as part of "ever increasing list of the cost of Brexit" and held the position that the plan was "a completely superficial expenditure which could have been spent on our hospitals and our schools."

Saudi Arabia 
Farron has criticised Britain's close ties with Saudi Arabia. In 2015 he said: "It is time to shine a light onto the shady corners of our relationship with Saudi Arabia. It is time we stood up for civil liberties, human rights and not turn a blind eye because the House of Saud are our 'allies'."

Cannabis regulation 
He supports the complete legalisation of marijuana for both medical and recreational purpose, saying in 2016: "I personally believe the war on drugs is over. We must move from making this a legal issue to one of health."

Personal life 
Farron is a lifelong non-conformist Protestant and says that "becoming a Christian at the age of eighteen [was] the most massive choice I have made." He is a vegetarian, and a lifelong fan of Blackburn Rovers. In January 2018 he won an edition of Celebrity Mastermind, with Blackburn Rovers as his specialist subject.

In 2019 he published an autobiography A Better Ambition: Confessions of a Faithful Liberal describing his life as a Christian and a Liberal.

Farron completed the 2021 London Marathon in a time of 4 h 44 min 44 s. raising funds for the Brathay Trust.

Selected publications

References

Further reading

External links 

 
 
 
 
 Tim Farron for Leader (archived on 13 July 2015), official 2015 party leadership campaign
 Profile (archived December 2013) at the Liberal Democrats

|-

|-

1970 births
Alumni of Newcastle University
Members of Lancashire County Council
Cumbria MPs
English evangelicals
Leaders of the Liberal Democrats (UK)
Living people
Liberal Democrats (UK) councillors
Liberal Democrats (UK) MPs for English constituencies
People from Milnthorpe
Politicians from Preston, Lancashire
UK MPs 2005–2010
UK MPs 2010–2015
UK MPs 2015–2017
UK MPs 2017–2019
UK MPs 2019–present